Savalas Jose Fransisco Clouting (born 8 September 1975) is a former speedway rider from England.

Speedway career 
Clouting reached the final of the British Speedway Championship in 1998. He rode in the top tier of British Speedway from 1992–2002, riding for various clubs. In addition to reaching the British Final he was crowned British Junior Champion in 1996 and reached the final of the Individual Speedway Junior World Championship in 1995.

Family
His son Jacob Clouting is a speedway rider.

References 

Living people
1975 births
British speedway riders
Eastbourne Eagles riders
Ipswich Witches riders
Lakeside Hammers riders
Poole Pirates riders